The men's Greco-Roman light heavyweight was a Greco-Roman wrestling event held as part of the Wrestling at the 1924 Summer Olympics programme. It was the fourth appearance of the event. Light heavyweight was the second-heaviest category, including wrestlers weighing 75 to 82.5 kilograms.

Results
Source: Official results; Wudarski

The tournament was double-elimination.

First round

Second round

Third round

Fourth round

Fifth round

Sixth round

After this round, the undefeated Svensson and Westergren and the one-loss Pellinen were left. Svensson and Westergren advanced to the seventh round to face each other for gold, while Pellinen received the bronze.

Seventh round

References

Wrestling at the 1924 Summer Olympics
Greco-Roman wrestling